Hummock Island is the largest of a group of islands in King George Bay in the Falkland Islands. Hummock Island is off the western coast of West Falkland, in a bay that leads to the estuary of the Chartres River.

Hummock Island is situated between Rabbit Island and Middle Island. Other islands in the Hummock Island group include Green Island and Gid's Island.
In the middle of the Twentieth Century the island was used as an extension of the New Island sheep farm, and heavy grazing caused much of the Tussac grass to be eaten out. This has left areas of bare 'black ground'. However,  the present owner has indicated that he will not restock the island but will allow the vegetation to recover.  Gid's and Middle Islands are nature reserves.

Important Bird Area
The Hummock Island group has been identified by BirdLife International as an Important Bird Area (IBA).  Birds for which the site is of conservation significance include southern rockhopper penguins (1700 breeding pairs), imperial shags, striated caracaras (8–10 pairs), and Cobb's wrens.

References

Islands of the Falkland Islands
Important Bird Areas of the Falkland Islands
Seabird colonies
Penguin colonies